Nyqvist is a surname. Notable people with the surname include:

Julius Nyqvist (born 1992), Finnish ice hockey player
Michael Nyqvist (1960–2017), Swedish actor
Per Nyqvist (born 1964), Swedish modern pentathlete
Vaadjuv Nyqvist (1902–1961), Norwegian sailor
Veikko Nyqvist (1916–1968), Finnish discus thrower

See also
Nyquist